The Cabinet of Iran (Heyatedovlat-e Iran) is a formal body composed of government officials, ministers, chosen and led by a President. Its composition must be approved by a vote in the Parliament. According to the Constitution of the Islamic Republic of Iran, the President may dismiss members of the cabinet, but must do so in writing, and new appointees must again be approved by the Parliament. The cabinet meets weekly on Saturdays in Tehran. There may be additional meetings if circumstances require it. The president chairs the meetings. The Supreme Leader (Ali Khamenei) has the power to dismiss cabinet members like ministers and vice presidents, as well as the President, at any time, regardless of the Parliament's decisions.

History

Before 1979 Islamic Revolution 
From 1699 until 1907 the Iranian cabinet was led by Premiers who were appointed by the Shah of Iran.

The Persian Constitutional Revolution of 1905 led to the creation of the Persian Constitution of 1906 and the establishment of the Iranian parliament, whose members were elected from the general population.  The position of premier was abolished and replaced by the Prime Minister of Iran.  The constitution stipulated that all Prime Minister must be subject to a vote in parliament for both approval and removal.

During the period 1907 to 1951 all Prime Ministers were selected by the Shah and subject to a vote-of-confidence by the Iranian Parliament.  From 1951 to 1953, the members of parliament elected the Prime Minister among themselves (the head of the party holding the majority of seats), through a vote-of-confidence. The Shah, as the head of state, then appointed the parliament's selection to the position of Prime Minister, in accordance with the Westminster system of parliamentary democracy.  Following the removal of Prime Minister Mohammad Mosaddegh via the 1953 Iranian coup d'état, this practice was abolished and the selection of Prime Minister reverted to the process in effect before 1951.

After 1979 Islamic Revolution 
Following the Iranian Revolution of 1979, the position of Shah was removed as the head of state, effectively ending Iran's history of monarchy. Iran's new Islamic constitution stipulated that the President of Iran would nominate the Iranian cabinet, including the Prime Minister, which was to be approved by a vote-of-confidence in the Iranian parliament.  The constitutional amendment of 1989 effectively ended the position of Prime Minister and transferred its powers to that of the president and vice president.

2009 appointments

President Ahmadinejad announced controversial ministerial appointments for his second term. Esfandiar Rahim Mashaei was briefly appointed as first vice president, but opposed by a number of Majlis members and by the intelligence minister, Gholam-Hossein Mohseni-Eje'i. Mashaei followed orders to resign. Ahmadinejad then appointed Mashaei as chief of staff, and fired Mohseni-Eje'i.

On 26 July 2009, Ahmadinejad's government faced a legal problem after he sacked four ministers. Iran's constitution (Article 136) stipulates that, if more than half of its members are replaced, the cabinet may not meet or act before the Majlis approves the revised membership. The Vice Chairman of the Majlis announced that no cabinet meetings or decisions would be legal, pending such a reapproval.

The main list of 21 cabinet appointments was announced on 19 August 2009. On 4 September, Parliament of Iran approved 18 of the 21 candidates and rejected three of them, including two women. Sousan Keshavarz, Mohammad Aliabadi, and Fatemeh Ajorlou were not approved by Parliament for the Ministries of Education, Energy, and Welfare and Social Security respectively. Marzieh Vahid-Dastjerdi won approval as health minister, making her Iran's first woman minister since the Islamic revolution.

2011 merges and dismissals

On 9 May, Ahmedinejad announced Ministries of Petroleum and Energy would merge, as would Industries and Mines with Commerce, and Welfare with Labour. On 13 May, he dismissed Masoud Mir-Kazemi (Minister of Petroleum), Ali Akbar Mehrabian (Minister Industry and Mines) and Sadegh Mahsouli (Minister of Welfare). On 15 May, he was announced he would be caretaker minister of the Petroleum Ministry.

From August 2009 to February 2013, a total of nine ministers in the cabinet were dismissed by the Majlis, the last of who was labor minister, Reza Sheykholeslam at the beginning of February 2013.

Rouhani's cabinet

Hassan Rouhani was elected as President of Iran in 2013 presidential election and took office on 3 August 2013. He nominated his coalition cabinet members to the parliament for vote of confidence on the next day. 15 out of 18 designated ministers were confirmed by the parliament.

Current cabinet members

List of Iranian governments 
Iranian governments after 1979 revolution
 Interim Government of Iran (1979)
 Council of the Islamic Revolution (1979–80)
 Government of Mohammad-Ali Rajai (1980–81)
 Government of Mohammad-Javad Bahonar (1981)
 Interim Government of Iran (1981)
 Government of Mir-Hossein Mousavi (1981–1989)
 Government of Akbar Hashemi Rafsanjani (1989–1997)
 Government of Mohammad Khatami (1997–2005)
 Government of Mahmoud Ahmadinejad (2005–2009)
 Government of Mahmoud Ahmadinejad (2009–2013)
 Government of Hassan Rouhani (2013–2017)
 Government of Hassan Rouhani (2017–2021)
 Government of Ebrahim Raisi (2021–present)

See also

 President of Iran
 Parliament of Iran
 List of female members of the Cabinet of Iran

References

External links
 Memorandum of the foreign trade regime of Iran – 145-page official PDF document describing all Ministries and institutes affiliated to the Government of Iran and their functions.

Politics of Iran
Government of Iran
Iran